Conne Island is a music venue and self-managed social centre in the Connewitz district of Leipzig, Germany. Conne Island is a stronghold and well-known meeting point for the radical left. Outside, there is a large skate park.

History
The building was built in the second half of the 19th-century. Initially, it was a restaurant called "Eiskeller" (ice pit). From 1937 onwards, it was used as a centre for the Hitler Jugend, and after 1945 in the GDR it was called "Klubhaus Erich Zeigner" and used as a FDJ youth club. Although the name "Eiskeller" is no longer officially used, this name is still in use by the local population as a nickname.

Conne Island has become a stronghold and well-known meeting point for the radical left. The centre hosts hardcore and punk gigs, and also hip-hop, electronic music and heavy metal. A performance by the band Mayhem, recorded in 1990 before the place became Conne Island, was published in 1993 under the name Live in Leipzig.

In the 2010s, the centre became known as an Anti-German project. Palestinian keffiyehs would be confiscated and returned at the end of the night with a note. The project celebrated 20 years of existence in 2011. In 2016 there were controversies when a self-confessed "Islam hater" spoke at the centre and women spoke up about being sexually harassed at club nights.

References

External links 
 Official website of Conne Island

Further reading 
 Alexander Lange: Spurensuche – Die Geschichte des Eiskellers bis 1945
 Assaf Uni: The good men of Leipzig (in Haaretz, 27.12.2006)

1991 establishments in Germany
Autonomism
Buildings and structures in Leipzig
Music venues in Germany
Social centres